The Weight of These Wings is the sixth studio album by American country music artist Miranda Lambert. It was released on November 18, 2016, via RCA Records Nashville. The album consists of two discs, with Disc 1 titled The Nerve, and Disc 2 titled The Heart. The album debuted at No. 1 on the Billboard Country Albums chart and No. 3 on the all-genre US Billboard 200 chart, and has been certified Platinum by the Recording Industry Association of America (RIAA). In addition to winning Album of the Year at the 2017 ACM Awards, it is considered by several music publications as one of the best albums of the year. In 2020, the album was ranked at 480 on Rolling Stone's 500 Greatest Albums of All Time list.

Background and music
In an August 2016 interview with Billboard, Lambert stated she had been working on the album for a year, which included writing and recording. She admitted she was nervous about her new music since she had mostly stayed quiet while writing it. Songwriter Luke Dick was one of the musicians who worked on the album. He co-wrote "Highway Vagabond" with Natalie Hemby and Shane McAnally. He found the line "I want to go somewhere nobody knows; and I want to know somewhere that nobody goes" while waiting at a deli and not willing to mix with other people. This became a road song with the word "vagabond" at the center, with a production sounding like country Siouxsie and the Banshees.

The album's content is about her divorce with Blake Shelton and her subsequent relationship with Anderson East.

Release and promotion
The album was released on November 18, 2016, through RCA Records Nashville.

Singles
"Vice" was released as the album's lead single on July 18, 2016. In its first week it sold 64,000 copies and debuted (and peaked) at number 2 on the Hot Country Songs chart. It ultimately reached a peak of number 11 on the Country Airplay chart. As of March 2017, the song has sold 508,000 copies in the United States.

"We Should Be Friends" was released as the second single on December 12, 2016. It was a Top 30 hit on the Hot Country Songs and Country Airplay charts.

"Tin Man" was released as the third single on April 3, 2017, immediately following Lambert's acoustic performance of the song on 52nd Academy of Country Music Awards. It peaked in the Top 20 of the Hot Country Songs chart, and the Top 30 of the Country Airplay chart.

"Keeper of the Flame" was released as the fourth single on April 16, 2018.

Critical reception

The Weight of These Wings received widespread acclaim from music critics. At Metacritic, which assigns a normalized rating out of 100 to reviews from mainstream critics, the album has an average score of 81 out of 100, which indicates "universal acclaim" based on 11 reviews. Stephen Thomas Erlewine from AllMusic rated the album at five out of five and in his review stated "It may have mainstream songs, but The Weight of These Wings isn't produced like a country-pop album, so it demands attention and rewards close listening." Paul Grein of HITS Daily Double predicted the album to be in contention for Album of the Year at the 60th Annual Grammy Awards.

The Weight of These Wings won the award for Album of the Year at the 2017 ACM Awards. It marks Lambert's fifth consecutive album to win the award, a record for any artist or group.

Accolades

Awards

Track listing
All tracks produced by Frank Liddell, Eric Masse, and Glenn Worf.

Personnel
Credits adapted from AllMusic.
Vocals

Chris Coleman – background vocals
Madi Diaz – background vocals
Anderson East – backing vocals on "Getaway Driver" and "Pushin' Time"
Miranda Lambert – lead vocals
Frank Liddell – background vocals
Annalise Liddell – background vocals
Eric Masse – background vocals
Aaron Raitiere – background vocals
Luke Reynolds – background vocals
Frank Rische – background vocals
Lillie Mae Rische – background vocals
Gwen Sebastian – background vocals
Lucie Silvas – background vocals
Glenn Worf – background vocals

Musicians

Chris Carmichael – strings, string arrangements 
Matt Chamberlain – drums, percussion
Chris Coleman – electric guitar, drums, violin, percussion, synthesizer, trumpet
Spencer Cullum – steel guitar, lap steel guitar
Louis Newman – timpani
Lex Price – bass guitar, acoustic guitar
Luke Reynolds – acoustic guitar, electric guitar, piano, synthesizer
Frank Carter Rische – acoustic guitar, electric guitar
Hargus "Pig" Robbins – piano
Glenn Worf – bass guitar, electric guitar, piano
Scotty Wray – electric guitar 

Production and imagery

Daniela Federici – photography
Tracy Baskette Fleaner – creative direction and design
Becky Fluke – photography
Brittany Hamlin – production coordination 
Tiffany Gifford – styling
Johnny Iavoy – photography
Moani Lee – make-up
Eric Masse – production
Annalise Liddell – engineering assistance
Frank Liddell – production
Gavin Lurssen – mastering
Chris Taylor – assistant, recording, mixing
Glenn Worf – production

Commercial performance
The Weight of These Wings debuted at number one on the Billboard Country Albums chart and number three on the all-genre US Billboard 200 chart, moving 133,000 equivalent album units in its first week of release. It sold 122,000 copies, with the remainder of its unit total reflecting the album's streaming activity and track sales. It is Lambert's fifth straight album to debut in the top ten of the Billboard 200, following Platinum (number one, 2014), Four the Record (number three, 2011), Revolution (number eight, 2009) and Crazy Ex-Girlfriend (number six, 2007). In its second week of release, the album moved 36,000 units and fell to number nine. 
Following the 52nd Academy of Country Music Awards on April 2, 2017, where Lambert won multiple awards and performed "Tin Man", the album moved 31,000 units, including 23,000 in pure sales, and jumped from number 192 to number 12 on the Billboard 200 chart. The album was certified Platinum on July 10, 2017, and it has sold 438,600 copies in the US as of August 2018.

Charts

Weekly charts

Year-end charts

Certifications

Release history
Source: Amazon.com

References

2016 albums
Albums produced by Frank Liddell
Miranda Lambert albums
RCA Records albums